This is a list of notable atlases, each a collection of maps, some including statistical data for the regions represented:

Early modern 
15th century
Douce Atlas (nautical atlas)

16th century
Theatrum Orbis Terrarum (Ortelius, Flanders, 1570–1612)
Piri Reis Map (Ottoman Empire, 1570–1612)
Mercator's Atlas (1578)

17th century
Atlas Novus (Blaeu, Netherlands, 1635–1658; 1645  edition at UCLA)
Dell'Arcano del Mare (England/Italy, 1645–1661)
Cartes générales de toutes les parties du monde (France, 1658–1676)
Klencke Atlas (1660; world's largest book)
Atlas Maior (Blaeu, Netherlands, 1662–1667)
Atlante Veneto (Coronelli, Venice, 1691)

18th century
Britannia Depicta (London, 1720)
Atlas Nouveau (Amsterdam, 1742)
Cary's New and Correct English Atlas (London, 1787)

Modern 
19th century
Andrees Allgemeiner Handatlas (Germany, 1881–1939; in the UK as Times Atlas of the World, 1895)
Atlas do Visconde de Santarem (Paris, 1841, 1842-1844, and 1849)
Bosatlas (Netherlands 1877–present)
Cedid Atlas (Istanbul, 1803)o
Rand McNally Atlas (United States, 1881–present)
Stielers Handatlas (Germany, 1817–1944)

20th century
Atlante Internazionale del Touring Club Italiano (Italy, 1927–1978)
Atlas Mira (Russia, 1937–present)
Geographers' A–Z Street Atlas (United Kingdom, 1938–present)
Gran Atlas Aguilar (Spain, 1969/1970)
Historical Atlas of China (Taiwan, 1980)
The Historical Atlas of China (China, 1982)
National Geographic Atlas of the World (United States, 1963–present)
Pergamon World Atlas (1962/1968)
Times Atlas of the World (United Kingdom, 1895–present)
Dorling Kindersley Atlas of the World 1994–present

Digital atlases 

TerraServer-USA/MSR Maps (1998)
NASA World Wind (2003)
Google Maps (2005)
WikiMapia (2006)
North American Environmental Atlas (2005)
Bing Maps (2010)

See also 

History of cartography
History of geography
List of historical maps
Cartography
Manifold
Bird atlas
Star atlas

References

External links 
Atlases at DavidRumsey.com includes many important atlases from the 18th-20th centuries
Charting North America, maps and atlases in the New York Public Library Digital Collection
Ryhiner Collection Composite atlas with maps, plans and views from the 16th-18th centuries, covering the globe, with about 16,000 images in total.

Atlases